Olanike Kudirat Adeyemo (17 July 1970, Ibadan, Nigeria) is a Nigerian professor of veterinary public health and preventive medicine at the University of Ibadan. She is the current Deputy Vice Chancellor of research, innovation and strategic partnership, the first person to attain the role at the university. Olanike's research focuses on aquatic and wildlife epidemiology and toxicology, food safety (including fish food safety), global public health, aquatic toxicology, and aquatic veterinary medicine. Member of the Steering Committee of the High Level Panel of Experts on Food Security and Nutrition (2022-2024) of the UN Committee on World Food Security.

Adeyemo is the first female veterinarian to be inducted into the African Academy of Sciences and the Nigerian Academy of Science.

In 2007, she was named a Fellow of the Eisenhower Fellowship Program and in 2002 she was named a Fellow of the Leadership for Environment and Development program in the UK. In 2010, she was named a Fellow of the African Scientific Institute (California, USA) and listed in ASI's 2011 edition of “Black Achievers in Science and Technology. In 2011, Adeyemo was appointed an epidemiological and toxicological expert on the Joint FAO/WHO Expert Committee (JECFA). In 2012, she was named a Fellow of the African Academy of Sciences. In 2016, she was named a Fellow of the Nigerian Academy of Science. In 2019 she was named a Fellow of The World Academy of Sciences for the advancement of science in developing countries, and Fellow at the Society for Environmental Toxicology and Pollution Mitigation.

Early life and education 
Adeyemo was born in Ibadan, Oyo State, Nigeria on 17 July 1970 to the family of late Alhaji Moshood Akanni Salami, Baale Ladogan of Iseyin, Oyo State, and Madam Modupeola Aduke Salami of Ile-Loosare, Igbajo, Osun State. From 1975 to 1978, Adeyemo studied at LEA Primary School, Kigo Road, Kaduna; later, from 1979 to 1981, she studied at CAC Primary School, Sango, Ibadan, Oyo State. She completed her secondary education at Ahmadiyya Grammar School (now Anwar-Ul-Islam Grammar School) in Eleyele, Ibadan, Oyo State; there, she obtained her West African Examination Council results in 1986. Before being admitted to the University of Ibadan, Adeyemo briefly obtained Advanced Level studies at St. Annes School, Molete, Ibadan Oyo State. She got her first degree in Veterinary Medicine from the University of Ibadan in 1994. She also obtained her master's degree and doctorate degree from the same institution in 1998 and 2005 respectively.

Career
From June 1994 to May 1995, Adeyemo participated in the National Youth Service Corps program as a Veterinary Officer with the Safana Local Government Area, Safana in Katsina State. She started her academic career as a lecturer grade 2 in 1999 at the Department of Veterinary Public Health and Preventive Medicine at the University of Ibadan after her master's degree program. In 2002, she was promoted to lecturer grade 1 until 2005 when she was made an Assistant professor. In 2008 she was made an Associate professor and in 2011 she was promoted to the rank of Professor.

In March 2017, Adeyemo was elected into the newly created office of Deputy Vice Chancellor for Research, Innovation and Strategic Partnership. Previously, she was the head of Veterinary Public Health and Preventive Medicine department.

In 2020, during the COVID-19 pandemic in Nigeria, Adeyemo was appointed the Chairperson of the Oyo State COVID-19 Decontamination and Containment Team.

Adeyemo is the first Nigerian woman in the field of Aquatic veterinary medicine. In an interview with The Punch, she described the manly nature of her discipline, described herself as not being woman-like, and explained that she gets along better with men. She also explained that she got to the top of her profession through hard work, and gender has little to do with it.

Adeyemo is an executive member of the Global Young Academy (2013), member of the African Academy of Sciences’ Commission on Women in Science in Africa (2014-date), member of Mauritius Declaration on Ocean Sciences (2016), member of Nigeria Academy of Science Committee on Science Advice in Africa (2019), Expert Group of the High-Level Panel on Building a Sustainable Ocean Economy (2019). Adeyemo is also a member of the Society of Toxicology, the World Aquatic Veterinary Medical Association, the Wildlife Disease Association, and the Nigerian Academy of Science.

Awards and recognitions 
In 2020, Adeyemo was awarded Scientist of the Year by the International Achievements Research Center (IARC). She was also featured in “Women in Science - Inspiring Stories from Africa”, a publication of Network of African Science Academies (NASAC); this publication profiled thirty women from eighteen countries across Africa who have excelled in various STEM careers.

Personal life 
Adeyemo is married to Biodun Adeyemo, a pharmacist, and together they have three sons and one daughter. She has stated that she is "blessed [to] have an understanding husband and children".

Selected scholarly articles 
She has publications in academic journals, as well as being a reviewer to internationally recognized academic journals.
 Agbede, S.A.; Adedeji, O.B.; Adeyemo, O.K. and Olufemi, B.E. (2001). Fish food  development, safety and security in Nigeria. Proceedings of the USDA/USAID/NIGERIA sponsored international conference on Food safety and security in Nigeria, held at IITA, Ibadan-Nigeria between 1–3 August 2001. 58–69. USA
 Naigaga, I. and Adeyemo, O.K. (2007). Environmental Change Assessment in Africa: Seasonal Fluctuation in the Atmospheric and Water Levels of Methane and Nitrous Oxide in Selected Aquatic Ecosystems in Uganda and Nigeria. Final Project Report for 2006 START/PACOM African Global Change Research Grants, 26pp.
 Adeyemo, O.K. (2009). Evaluation for Sustainability of Aquaculture Development in Nigeria. Final Project Report on 2008/2009 USDA/Foreign Agricultural Service (FAS) grant, 28pp.

External links 

 https://www.wikidata.org/wiki/Q43549311
 https://vet.ui.edu.ng/OKAdeyemo
 https://orcid.org/0000-0003-3404-5090
 https://www.linkedin.com/in/olanikeadeyemo/?originalSubdomain=ng

References 

1970 births
Living people
Nigerian women academics
University of Ibadan alumni
Academic staff of the University of Ibadan
People from Oyo State
Fellows of the African Academy of Sciences